Östavalls IF is a Swedish football club located in Östavall.

Background
Östavalls IF currently plays in Division 3 Mellersta Norrland which is the fifth tier of Swedish football. They play their home matches at the Skogsvallens IP in Östavall.

The club is affiliated to Medelpads Fotbollförbund.

Season to season

Footnotes

External links
 Östavalls IF – Official website
 Östavalls IF on Facebook
 Östavalls IF Supporters Club on Facebook

Sport in Västernorrland County
Football clubs in Västernorrland County
1928 establishments in Sweden